Pavel Mikhailovich Kondratiev (1902-1985) was a Russian painter and graphic artist.

He studied art at Vkhutein in Petrograd.

Kondratiev was a gifted teacher. He collaborated with Vladimir Sterligov among others; his work is seen as a synthesis several areas of the Russian avant-garde. Among his most famous works are “North Caucasus”, “Remembering Chukotka”, “Pskov Land” “Sheaves”, “Sisters of Mercy”.

He died in Leningrad in 1985.

References

External links
Pavel Kondatyev in Virtual Russian Museum

20th-century Russian painters
1902 births
1985 deaths
Soviet painters
Soviet avant-garde